Mascara and Monsters: The Best of Alice Cooper is a compilation album by rock singer Alice Cooper, released by Warner Archives/Rhino in 2001 in the United States only. Its worldwide companion release is The Definitive Alice Cooper compilation album, which has a slightly different track listing and different packaging, though both compilations feature the same back cover and disc image. The album features material from his solo career and from his tenure with the Alice Cooper band; however, like the 1974 Greatest Hits compilation, material from Pretties for You and Easy Action is not present on Mascara and Monsters.

The album cover features Cooper in the mid-1970s looking at his mascara-eyed monstrous alter-ego.

Track listing

References 

Alice Cooper compilation albums
2001 greatest hits albums
Rhino Records compilation albums